Hryhorivka（), is a village in southern Ukraine, which is located in Kakhovka Raion of Kherson Oblast and hosts the administration of the Hryhorivka rural hromada, one of the Hromadas of Ukraine. 

The village is near Lake Lemuria, a lake in Ukraine well-known for its pink color, which comes from beta-carotene-producing algae.

It has an area of 4.3 km2 and a population of approximately 1,814 people.

Languages Spoken 
Ukrainian: 87.05%

Russian: 5.68%

Others: 7.27%

History 
The village became part of the Russian Empire after Russia annexed the Crimean Khanate in 1783. The village was founded in 1869, and became part of the short-lived Ukrainian People's Republic during the Russian Civil War. The village suffered through Holodomor from 1932-1933, where 9 residents from this small village alone died from starvation. It was occupied by Nazi Germany during the Second World War, but was liberated by Soviet forces during the Battle of the Dnieper. In late February 2022, during the southern campaign of Russia's invasion, the village became occupied by Russian forces, and is still currently under occupation.

References 

 Погода в селі Григорівка (Archived)

Villages in Kakhovka Raion